Paragominas is a municipality in the state of Pará in the Northern region of Brazil. Paragominas mine, one of the largest bauxite mines in the world, is approximately 70 km away. According to an estimate dated 1 July 2020, the city has a population of 111,764 and is at an altitude of 90 m above sea level. M. With a municipal area of ​​approximately 19,342 km², it has a population density of 5.7 inhabitants per km², approximately the size of the state of Rhineland-Palatinate. Its distance from the capital Belém is 300 km.

Since 2011 it has been allowed to call itself Município Verde (Green City or Eco-City).

Toponimia 
The name of the municipality originates from a series of abbreviations for the states of Pará, Goiás and Minas Gerais ("Para-Go-Minas").

History 
The city was founded in 1965 .

Climate 
The city has a tropical climate according to Köppen-Geiger. The average temperature is 26.6 °C. Average annual precipitation is 1805 mm.

Average monthly temperature and precipitation for Paragominas

Population 
Source: IBGE (2020 figure is an estimate only).

ethnic composition  
Ethnic groups according to the statistical classification of the IBGE

See also 
List of municipalities in Pará

References

Municipalities in Pará